The Long-Range Hypersonic Weapon (LRHW) is a medium-range surface-to-surface hypersonic weapon planned for use by the United States Army. The United States Navy intends to procure a ship/submarine-launched variant of the missile as part of the service's Intermediate-Range Conventional Prompt Strike (IRCPS) program. The weapon consists of a large  rocket booster that carries the unpowered Common-Hypersonic Glide Body (C-HGB) in a nose cone. Once the booster reaches significant altitude and speed, it releases the C-HGB, which glides at hypersonic speeds as it descends towards its target. Dynetics will build the glide vehicle while Lockheed Martin will build the booster as well as assemble the missile and launch equipment.  

The C-HGB has been successfully tested twice, in October 2017 and March 2020. The missile is planned to enter service with the Army in 2023. The Navy intends to field the weapon aboard its  Zumwalt-class destroyers by 2025 and later on its Block V  Virginia-class submarines in 2028; it was intended to also be fielded on guided missile variants of the Ohio-class ballistic missile submarines, but funding delays and the boats' impending retirement caused those plans to be scrapped.

Development and testing

Common-Hypersonic Glide Body
In 2018, the Navy was designated to lead the design of the Common-Hypersonic Glide Body with input from the Army's Rapid Capabilities and Critical Technologies Office.

Design

The design of the Common-Hypersonic Glide Body is based on the previously developed Alternate Re-Entry System, which was tested in the early 2010s as part of the Army's Advanced Hypersonic Weapon program. The Alternate Re-Entry System was itself based on the Sandia Winged Energetic Reentry Vehicle Experiment (SWERVE) prototype developed by Sandia National Laboratories in the 1980s. Design work is by Sandia while Dynetics constructs prototypes and test units.

Testing
The first test of the Intermediate Range Conventional Prompt Strike Flight Experiment-1, was on 30 October 2017. A missile capable of fitting in the launch tube of an Ohio-class ballistic missile submarine flew over 2,000 nautical miles from Hawaii to the Marshall Islands at hypersonic speeds. The Common-Hypersonic Glide Body was tested in March 2020.

LRHW subsystems were tested at Project Convergence 2022 (PC22).

Boosters
The first stage solid rocket motor was tested 27 May 2020.

Both stages of the missile booster as well as a thrust vector control system were tested in 2021.

On 29 October 2021, the booster rocket for the Long-Range Hypersonic Weapon was successfully tested in a static test in Utah; the first stage thrust vector control system was included in the test.

In March 2021, training with inert missile canisters began. On 7 October 2021,  17th Field Artillery Brigade of the I Corps received ground equipment for the first operational LRHW battery.

In June 2022 in Hawaii, a launch failure of Conventional Prompt Strike occurred after ignition. The test of an All-Up-Round for CPS, which uses a two-stage booster, failed before ignition of the C-HGB.

Planned service entry
The United States Army intends to deploy the Long-Range Hypersonic Weapon in an eight missile battery containing four  M983 trucks and trailers each holding two missiles in launch canisters alongside a command vehicle.
The LRHW has been named Dark Eagle by the US Army.

See also
OpFires - another Lockheed Martin boost glide medium range system
AGM-183 ARRW
Prompt Global Strike

References

United States defense procurement
Proposed weapons of the United States